Alex Fergusson (born 16 December 1952) is a Scottish guitarist / record producer.

Fergusson played in the Nobodies, with Sandy Robertson (later a rock journalist of note), before forming the punk band Alternative TV with Mark Perry in 1977, and a few years later (in 1981) joined Psychic TV. He left the latter in 1987.

In 1993 he released an eponymous white label vinyl LP, followed by Perverse Ballads in 1996, The Essence in 2001, and The Castle in 2006.

As a record producer under the working title of AF Productions, Fergusson has worked with a list of musicians, including Orange Juice, The Go-Betweens, Dorothy Max Prior (Dorothy) and Gaye Bykers on Acid.

References

External links 
 

1952 births
Living people
Musicians from Glasgow
Scottish punk rock guitarists
Scottish record producers
Psychic TV members